Chip Chinery (born August 10, 1964) is an American stand-up comedian and actor.

Early life
Chinery was born in Cincinnati, Ohio, United States.  At age 16, he made his stand-up comedy debut at a bar called d.w.eye. He graduated from Miami University with his bachelor's degree in business psychology. Chinery worked at WCPO-TV as a cameraman, then at TheBankMart in Bridgeport, Connecticut.

Career
In 1988, Chinery started touring full-time on the stand-up circuit. In 1993, he won an Emmy for "On-Air Performer" in the Midwest region for his work on Frog News and Cincinnati's Comedy Relief.

In 1999, Chinery released his very first comedy album, You Might Be A Redhead.

As an actor, he has guest-starred on over 50 different TV shows and films, including Seinfeld, Friends, Curb Your Enthusiasm, 3rd Rock from the Sun, Better Off Ted, Rules of Engagement, Anger Management, and Coyote Ugly.  He plays recurring characters on Crash & Bernstein and Wilfred.

He also provided the voice of Crash Bandicoot in the video game Crash Team Racing, replacing  Brendan O'Brien respectively.

Chinery's award-winning Chip's Money Tips, debuted in 2008, to give "Money Tips in a Candy-Coated Shell" through humorous, entertaining and informative videos and written posts.  Chinery says, "Most people are clueless about money. Not you - them. Other people."

He also works as a personal finance advisor.

Filmography

Film

Television

Video games

Discography
 You Might Be A Redhead (1999)

References

External links
 Chip Chinery's website 
 Chip's Money Tips website
 

1964 births
Living people
American male comedians
American male film actors
American male television actors
American male video game actors
American male voice actors
20th-century American comedians
20th-century American male actors
21st-century American comedians
21st-century American male actors